The Bama Band is an American country music group composed of Lamar Morris (vocals, guitar), Wayne "Animal" Turner (guitar), Clifford E. "Cowboy" Eddie Long (steel guitar), Jerry McKinney (saxophone), Vernon Derrick (fiddle), Ray Barrickman (bass), Billy Earheart (keyboards) and William Claude Marshall (drums). For more than twenty years, the Bama Band was the backing band for Hank Williams, Jr. The Bama Band was nominated twice for Band of the Year by the Academy of Country Music. They also found success on the Billboard Hot Country Singles chart in the 1980s with singles like "Dallas," "Tijuana Sunrise" and "What Used to Be Crazy." An eponymous album released on Compleat Records in 1985 charted on the Billboard Top Country Albums chart.

Discography

Albums

Singles

Guest singles

Music videos

References

External links
[ The Bama Band] at Allmusic

American country music groups